Emmanuel Scheffer (‎; 1 February 1924 – 28 December 2012) was an Israeli football player and coach who was born in Germany.

He was twice the manager of the Israel national football team (1968–70, 1978–79), led the team at the 1968 Summer Olympics, and led the team to their only appearance in the World Cup, in 1970.

Scheffer died on 28 December 2012.   He was 88.

Honours

As a Player
Israeli Second Division
Winner (1): 1951–52

As a Manager
AFC U-19 Championship
Winner (4): 1964, 1965, 1966, 1967

References

1924 births
2012 deaths
Footballers from Berlin
Israeli footballers
Association football defenders
Śląsk Wrocław players
Hapoel Haifa F.C. players
Hapoel Kfar Saba F.C. players
Israeli football managers
Hapoel Kfar Saba F.C. managers
Bnei Yehuda Tel Aviv F.C. managers
Maccabi Netanya F.C. managers
Beitar Jerusalem F.C. managers
Israel national football team managers
1970 FIFA World Cup managers
Israeli Jews
German emigrants to Israel